Jameh Mosque of Jahrom built during the Seljuq dynasty from the mosques of this city that is located in the old Sinan neighborhood of Jahrom.

References

Mosques in Jahrom
Buildings and structures in Jahrom
Mosque buildings with domes
National works of Iran